David Goldie (20 December 1946 – 7 April 2002) was a priest in the Church of England.

Goldie was educated at Glasgow Academy and Fitzwilliam College, Cambridge and ordained in 1971. After curacies in Swindon and Troon he was mission priest at Irving new town. He later held incumbencies at Ardrossan and Milton Keynes. He became the Archdeacon of Buckingham in 1998 and held the post for four years.

References

1946 births
2002 deaths
People educated at the Glasgow Academy
Alumni of Fitzwilliam College, Cambridge
Archdeacons of Buckingham